The Crewe Alexandra F.C. Academy is the player development centre of English Football League club Crewe Alexandra F.C. Set up by manager Dario Gradi in the late 1980s, it achieved official status as an FA Youth Academy in the late 1990s. By concentrating on developing its own players the club remained profitable (a rare thing in lower-division football at the time) by selling them on after they have gained experience with Crewe. The Academy is known to stress technical excellence, which accords with the aim to have the first team play attractive, passing football. Academy graduates include full England internationals Rob Jones, Danny Murphy, Seth Johnson and Dean Ashton and Wales international David Vaughan, plus the club's current manager and assistant manager.

History 
During the late 1980s, Gradi and club chairman John Bowler got the local council to contribute to the costs of an all-weather pitch on waste ground to the south of Gresty Road. This formed the starting point for a youth coaching facility managed by Bill Prendergast, which by the early 1990s was coaching 120 youngsters every week. In 1995, Crewe leased a 20-acre site at Reaseheath, near Nantwich, planning a £750,000 training and player development facility largely funded by transfer sales: since 1983, Crewe had raised £3 million in fees while expending just £200,000. A year later, in 1996, Crewe received a lottery grant to develop a youth coaching facility in nearby Shavington (which eventually replaced the Gresty Road all-weather pitch, removed during redevelopment of Crewe's main stand in 1999-2000). By 2015, player sales had generated over £20 million which had largely been invested in modernising Gresty Road and in developing its Academy set-up. Crewe was the only club outside the top two divisions to have a Category Two academy club.

Players who passed through the ranks at Crewe include the England international players Geoff Thomas and David Platt and Welshman Robbie Savage, and Northern Ireland internationals Neil Lennon and Steve Jones (Platt was the most successful, totalling more than £20 million in transfers and captaining the England team). All these were youngsters signed from other clubs, but Gradi also had considerable success in nurturing Crewe's own trainees - notably full England internationals Rob Jones, Danny Murphy, Seth Johnson and Dean Ashton and Wales international David Vaughan.

Over 100 former youth players have made it into the first team at Crewe. In April 2013, in the team's final game of the season, manager Steve Davis fielded a team whose starting 11 were all Crewe Academy graduates. This feat was repeated five years later by Davis's successor David Artell (formerly operations manager at the Academy) on 5 May 2018.

In April 2022, Artell's immediate successor as Crewe manager, Alex Morris, became the first Academy graduate to manage the club's first team, with another graduate, Lee Bell, as assistant. Bell's predecessor as assistant manager, Kenny Lunt, was also an Academy graduate.

In 2020–2021, Crewe's academy was ranked 11th highest of 82 in England and Wales, and was the highest ranked Category Two Academy, in terms of producing players who had made league appearances. In 2021–2022, the academy climbed to 9th overall, ahead of Liverpool's academy.

Notable graduates
Players highlighted in bold have gained international caps for their countries. Players who were signed straight to the first team from elsewhere are not included (such as former internationals Neil Lennon, David Platt, Robbie Savage, and Geoff Thomas).

 Rio Adebisi
 Dele Adebola
 Callum Ainley
 Ben Amos
 Dean Ashton
 Ryan Austin
 James Bailey
 James Baillie
 Lee Bell
 Paul Bignot
 Lewis Billington
 Junior Brown
 Mark Carrington
 Max Clayton
 Chris Clements
 George Cooper
 Ryan Colclough
 Neil Critchley
 Owen Dale
 Brendon Daniels
 Harry Davis
 Maurice Doyle
 Adam Dugdale
 Chey Dunkley
 Paul Edwards
 Rob Edwards
 Connor Evans
 Gareth Evans
 Nick Farquharson
 Charlie Finney
 Oliver Finney
 Christopher Flynn
 Stephen Foster
 Ben Garratt
 Steve Garvey
 John Grant
 Regan Griffiths
 Michael Higdon
 Matúš Holíček
 Caspar Hughes
 Rob Hulse
 Michael Jackson
 Eddie Johnson
 Seth Johnson
 Travis Johnson
 Billy Jones
 James Jones
 Rob Jones
 Charlie Kirk
 Sean Lawton
 Scott Leather
 A-Jay Leitch-Smith
 Tom Lowery
 Matthew Lund
 Josh Lundstram
 Kenny Lunt
 Owen Lunt
 Joe Lynch
 Nicky Maynard
 Ben Marshall
 Chris McCready
 Shaun Miller
 Byron Moore
 Alex Morris
 Toby Mullarkey
 Danny Murphy
 Luke Murphy
 Perry Ng
 Liam Nolan
 Michael O'Connor
 Luke Offord
 Connor O'Riordan
 Jason Oswell
 Harry Pickering
 Tom Pope
 Nick Powell
 George Ray
 Paul Rennie
 Lewis Reilly
 Mark Rivers
 Ben Rix
 Joe Robbins
 Gary Roberts
 Mark Roberts
 James Robinson
 Billy Sass-Davies
 Callum Saunders
 Danny Shelley
 Peter Smith
 Neil Sorvel
 Kevin Street
 Ritchie Sutton
 Joel Tabiner
 Stuart Tomlinson
 Matthew Tootle
 Daniel Trickett-Smith
 Ollie Turton
 David Vaughan
 Richard Walker
 Steve Walters
 Billy Waters
 Ashley Westwood
 Gareth Whalley
 Owain Fôn Williams
 Zac Williams
 Kyle Wilson
 Andy Woodward
 Nathan Woodthorpe
 David Wright
 Adam Yates

References

Sources

External links
Club website
Alex Soccer Centre website

Academy
Football academies in England
Lancashire League (football)